Gambit was a special interest group for those in the gambling and gaming (used here as a synonym for gambling) industries.

The Steering Committee was led by Dr. Stefan Szymanski, Associate Dean, MBA Programs, Cass Business School and a Cass Executive MBA alumnus, Gareth Wong and included senior executives, regulators and editors.

References

External links
 Degree of certainty in the gambling industry, The Times, 13 Oct 2005

Organizations established in 2005
Business organisations based in London
Defunct gambling companies